Stigmella fluida is a moth of the family Nepticulidae. It was described by Edward Meyrick in 1911. It is found in South Africa (it was described from Transvaal).

References

Endemic moths of South Africa
Nepticulidae
Moths of Africa
Moths described in 1911